"Do I Look Like a Slut?", known as "Slut?" for the album version, is a song by American electroclash duo Avenue D from their second studio album, Bootleg (2004). It reached number eight on the Billboard Hot Dance Singles Sales chart in 2005.

Reception
Michael Hamersly of The Miami Herald called the song a "ranchy anthem". Tom Bowker of The Miami Herald noted that by 2005 the song had become a "club hit". According to The Dallas Morning News by October 2005 the song had reached number 10 on a list of "Local Pop Singles".

Impact
The popularity of the song later motivated Debbie D. to leave the group Avenue D; she commented in a 2009 interview with The Miami Herald, "I was ready to do something new. I was tired of everybody coming up to me and asking me, 'Do I look like a slut?' Irony only goes so far. We turned into the characters in our songs. We wrote them when we were 21. By 28 I had just outgrown it."

Track listings
UK CD single
"Do I Look Like a Slut" (Larry Tee Original) – 5:25
"Do I Look Like a Slut" (SupaLaska Retouch) – 5:25
"Do I Look Like a Slut" (Smokescreen Remix) – 5:39
"Do I Look Like a Slut" (Video)
"Bang" (Live at Nag Nag Nag/06.08.03) (Video)

UK 12" single
A1. "Do I Look Like a Slut" (Larry Tee Original) – 5:25
A2. "Do I Look Like a Slut" (SupaLaska Retouch) – 5:25
B1. "Do I Look Like a Slut" (Smokescreen Remix) – 5:39

US CD maxi single
"Do I Look Like a Slut?" (Original Version) – 4:53
"Do I Look Like a Slut?" (Sizequeen Remix) – 7:22
"Do I Look Like a Slut?" (DJ Rooster & Sammy Peralta Remix) – 8:34
"Do I Look Like a Slut?" (Robbie Rivera Remix) – 7:28
"Do I Look Like a Slut?" (Jerel's Action Blacktion Mix) – 7:37
"Do I Look Like a Slut?" (James Thinks You're a Slut Mix) – 11:16
"Do I Look Like a Slut?" (Peter's Sluts on the Runway Mix) – 7:22

US 12" single – Remixes by Robbie Rivera / DJ Rooster & Sammy Peralta
A. "Do I Look Like a Slut?" (Robbie Rivera Mix) – 7:28
B. "Do I Look Like a Slut?" (DJ Rooster & Sammy Peralta Remix) – 8:34

US 12" single – Remixes by Sizequeen & Hector Fonseca
A. "Do I Look Like a Slut?" (Sizequeen Remix) – 7:22
B. "Do I Look Like a Slut?" (Hector Fonseca Remix) – 7:58

US digital single
"Do I Look Like a Slut?" (Original Version) – 4:55
"Do I Look Like a Slut?" (Hector Fonseca Wants to Shake It Remix) – 7:58
"Do I Look Like a Slut?" (Sizequeen Remix) – 7:23
"Do I Look Like a Slut?" (Robbie Rivera Remix) – 7:30
"Do I Look Like a Slut?" (Jerel's Action Blacktion Mix) – 7:39
"Do I Look Like a Slut?" (DJ Rooster & Sammy Peralta Remix) – 8:36
"Do I Look Like a Slut?" (James Thinks You're a Slut Mix) – 11:16
"Do I Look Like a Slut?" (Peter's Sluts on the Runway Mix) – 7:22

US digital single – D-Unity + Seductive 2011 remixes
"Do I Look Like a Slut?" (D-Unity Remix) – 7:00
"Do I Look Like a Slut?" (Seductive Remix) – 5:37

Charts

Release history

References

External links
 

2004 singles
2004 songs
Avenue D (band) songs
Songs with feminist themes
Songs written by Larry Tee